Refinería is a station along Line 7 of the metro of Mexico City. The station is located close to the Pemex 18 de marzo refinery in the Colonia Ángel Zimbrón neighborhood of the Azcapotzalco borough northwest of the city center, between the stations of Camarones and Tacuba. Its logo represents three containers of the Pemex refinery.

The station opened on 29 November 1988 as a part of the five-station northern stretch of Line 7 between Tacuba and El Rosario.

From 23 April to 17 June 2020, the station was temporarily closed due to the COVID-19 pandemic in Mexico.

Ridership

References 

Mexico City Metro Line 7 stations
Pemex
Railway stations opened in 1988
1988 establishments in Mexico
Mexico City Metro stations in Azcapotzalco
Accessible Mexico City Metro stations